Jim Evans (born July 12, 1948) is a candidate for the United States House of Representatives' 7th Congressional district in Missouri, having run in 2012 and again in 2014, as the Democratic nominee in both elections. He also challenged incumbent Representative Billy Long in the Republican Party primary in 2018. Evans is a retired American businessman, teacher, and U.S. Army veteran.

Biography
Evans was born in Republic, Missouri July 12, 1948, and later graduated from Republic High School in 1966.  From 1970 to 1971, Evans served in the United States Army at Fort Sill, Oklahoma during the Vietnam War as a Pershing missile crewman.  After leaving the Army, he went on to earn a Bachelor's degree in Education and a Master's degree in Mathematics from Southwest Missouri State University (now Missouri State University).  Evans married Teresa D. Posey on January 10, 1972.

In addition to teaching junior high and high school math and computer science at Logan-Rogersville and Springfield public schools, Evans raised beef cattle for ten years and owned a real estate investment and property management business.

Electoral campaign history

2012 election

In the 2012 Missouri 7th district election, Evans, having run unopposed in the Democratic primary, lost the general election against Republican incumbent Billy Long, receiving 30.9% of votes.  Despite the loss, Evans received 98,498 votes—more votes in the general election than any Democratic candidate for the 7th district U.S. House seat since 1992 and the third highest number of votes cast for a 7th district Democratic candidate for Congress in history.

2014 election

On March 20, 2014, Evans officially filed for candidacy in the Missouri 7th district congressional race.  He narrowly defeated millennial candidate Genevieve Williams by a margin of 53.8% to 46.2% in the Democratic primary race on August 5.  Williams subsequently endorsed Evans' candidacy, writing "I am repeating here what I have told Jim many times, he has my full support and I will do everything in my power to help him defeat Billy Long."  Evans  faced Republican incumbent Billy Long in the November 4th general election and lost by a margin of 63% to 29%, with the remaining 8% of votes going to Libertarian candidate Kevin Craig.

2018 election

Evans announced his candidacy on August 3, 2017. He will be challenging Benjamin Holcomb, Lance Norris, and incumbent Representative Billy Long in the Republican primary on August 7.

Political positions
Evans, an independent-minded candidate, described himself as an "Eisenhower Democrat" when announcing his candidacy for the 2014 congressional race, further stating:

Environmental activism
An advocate of minimizing human impact on the environment, Evans favors decreasing reliance on coal and petroleum as energy sources in favor of alternative means.

In 1976, he and his wife built their own energy efficient home outside of Republic, Missouri, complete with 160 square feet of solar thermal collectors on its roof which transfer heat to a 500-gallon tank for water heating.  They later fitted the residence with an array of photovoltaic solar panels in 2010, which produce 128% of the home's energy needs.

Electoral history

References

External links
Jim Evans campaign website

1948 births
Living people
Missouri Democrats
Missouri State University alumni
People from Republic, Missouri